Monika Wejnert (born 6 April 1992) is an Australian former tennis player. Her highest WTA singles ranking is 324, which she reached on 30 November 2009. Her career high ranking in doubles is No. 315, which she reached on 31 January 2011.

Career

Born in Brisbane, during the 2009 Australian Open wildcards round robin, Wejnert Defeated Jelena Dokić in three sets. They met again in the final where She lost to Dokic in a three-set thriller.
At the Brisbane International Wejnert lost to finalist Marion Bartoli 6–1, 6–2.
At the Australian Open Wejnert lost in the first Round to Karin Knapp in a tight match 7–6, 6–4,
Monika has recently played in the AEGON trophy in Nottingham where she beat Mandy Minella in the first round before losing to Sandra Záhlavová. At that time Monika was ranked 300 in the world rankings

Monika Wejnert attended Rochedale State School, Rochedale, Brisbane before moving to Saint Stephen's College on the Gold Coast for her final years of high school.

ITF finals (1–2)

Singles: 1 (1–0)

Doubles: 2 (0–2)

References 
 
 
 

1992 births
Living people
Australian female tennis players
Australian people of Polish descent
Tennis players from Brisbane
Tennis people from the Gold Coast